Alfred Bertram Guthrie Jr. (January 13, 1901 – April 26, 1991) was an American novelist, screenwriter, historian, and literary historian known for writing western stories. His novel The Way West won the 1950 Pulitzer Prize for Fiction, and his screenplay for Shane (1953) was nominated for an Academy Award.

Biography
Guthrie was born in 1901 in Bedford, Indiana. When he was six months old he relocated with his parents to Montana, where his father became the first principal of the Teton County Free High School in Choteau. His father was a graduate of Indiana University,  his mother from Earlham College at Richmond, Indiana.

A constant reader, Guthrie tried to write while in high school, "fiction pretty much, some essays, but I majored in journalism. My father had been a newspaper man for four years in this little town in Kentucky, and I guess he thought it was the way to become a writer".:3

In 1919, Guthrie entered the University of Washington, then transferred to the University of Montana, where he was a member of Phi Sigma Kappa fraternity and graduated with honors in 1923. He worked odd jobs for the next few years.

In 1926, Guthrie took out a $300 bank loan and moved to Lexington, Kentucky, where he took a job at the Lexington Leader newspaper. For the next 21 years he worked as a reporter, the city editor, and an editorial writer for the Leader. Guthrie published his first novel Murders at Moon Dance in 1943.

In 1944, while still at the Leader, Guthrie won the Nieman Fellowship from Harvard, and spent the year at the university studying writing. While at Harvard he made friends with English professor Theodore Morrison, "who knew so much about writing, probably more than I ever will.":3 Morrison mentored Guthrie and helped him transition from journalism to fiction.

During his year at Harvard Guthrie began his novel The Big Sky, which was published in 1947. Guthrie later wrote, "It wasn't until I went to Harvard that I got in gear. Then I went back and worked for the newspaper for another year or so.":4

At the Lexington Leader Guthrie's boss was very understanding and as long as Guthrie performed his news duties satisfactorily he was allowed to take his afternoons off to write fiction.:18 After publication of The Big Sky Guthrie left the paper and supported himself by teaching creative writing at University of Kentucky. During this time he published The Way West which won the 1950 Pulitzer Prize for Fiction. He quit teaching in 1952 to devote his full-time to writing, and moved back to Choteau, Montana, because he said it was his "point of outlook on the universe". He split his residence between Choteau and Great Falls, Montana, an hour away from Choteau.

Guthrie continued to write predominantly western subjects. He worked for a time in Hollywood, writing the screenplays for Shane (1953, for which he was nominated for an Academy Award) and The Kentuckian (1955).

His other books included These Thousand Hills (1956), The Blue Hen's Chick (1965), Arfive (1970), The Last Valley (1975), Fair Land, Fair Land (1982), Murder in the Cotswolds (1989), and A Field Guide to Writing Fiction (1991). His first collection of short stories, The Big It and Other Stories, was published in 1960.

Guthrie died in 1991, at age 90, at his ranch near Choteau.

Bibliography

Western Novels
The Big Sky (1947)
The Way West (1949)
These Thousand Hills (1956)
Arfive (1971)
The Last Valley (1975)
Fair Land, Fair Land (1982)

Western Mystery Novellas
Murders at Moon Dance (1943)
Wild Pitch (1974), featuring Sheriff Chick Charleston
The Genuine Article (1977), featuring Sheriff Chick Charleston
No Second Wind (1980), featuring Sheriff Chick Charleston
Playing Catch-up (1985), featuring Sheriff Chick Charleston
Murder in the Cotswolds (1989), featuring Sheriff Chick Charleston

Short-story collections
 The Big It, and Other Stories (1960), "Bargain" (originally titled "Bargain at Moon Dance")

Non-fiction
 The Blue Hen's Chick (1965)
 Big Sky, Fair Land: The Environmental Essays of A. B. Guthrie Jr., edited by David Peterson (1988)
 A Field Guide to Writing Fiction (1991)

Children's books
The Big Sky: An Edition For Young Readers (1950)
Once Upon a Pond (1973)

Poetry
Four Miles from Ear Mountain (1987)

Screenplays
Shane (1953)
The Kentuckian (1955)

Spoken word
A. B. Guthrie Jr., reads from THE BIG SKY (Caedmon, 1974)

References

External links
Western American Literature Journal: A.B. Guthrie
U. Eastern Kentucky site
Literary History of the American West page on Guthrie
A. B. Guthrie Jr. Papers. Yale Collection of American Literature, Beinecke Rare Book and Manuscript Library.

1901 births
1991 deaths
People from Great Falls, Montana
Nieman Fellows
Novelists from Kentucky
Pulitzer Prize for Fiction winners
20th-century American novelists
American male novelists
American literary critics
American environmentalists
20th-century American historians
Activists from Indiana
Activists from Montana
Activists from Kentucky
People from Choteau, Montana
Novelists from Montana
Novelists from Indiana
20th-century American male writers
American male non-fiction writers